Mecinini is a tribe of true weevils in the family of beetles known as Curculionidae. There are at least three genera and about eight described species in Mecinini.

Genera
These three genera belong to the tribe Mecinini:
 Cleopomiarus Pierce, 1919 c g b
 Mecinus Germar, 1821 i c g b
 Rhinusa Stephens, 1829 c g b
Data sources: i = ITIS, c = Catalogue of Life, g = GBIF, b = Bugguide.net

References

Further reading

External links

 

Curculioninae